Thomas Eric Ivar Wernersson (born 15 June 1955), better known as Thomas Wernerson, is a Swedish former professional footballer who played as a goalkeeper. Starting off his career with Åtvidabergs FF in the mid-1970s, he is best remembered for his time with IFK Göteborg between 1981 and 1987 with which he won two UEFA Cup titles and four Swedish Championships. A full international between 1979 and 1985, he won nine caps for the Sweden national team.

Club career

Åtvidabergs FF 
Wernerson started off his career with Åtvidabergs FF, and witnessed the team win the 1972 and 1973 Allsvenskan seasons as a youth player before being promoted to the senior team in 1975. He spent a total of six seasons at Åtvidaberg, and helped the team win promotion back to Allsvenskan in 1977 after having been relegated in 1976. He was also a part of the Åtvidaberg team that reached the final of the 1978–79 Svenska Cupen, losing to IFK Göteborg.

IFK Göteborg 
Wernerson was signed to IFK Göteborg by Sven-Göran Eriksson after the 1980 Allsvenskan season. He made his IFK Göteborg debut in a 1981 Allsvenskan game against GIF Sundsvall. He went on to help the team win four Swedish championships (1982, 1983, 1984, and 1987), two Svenska Cupen titles (1981–82 and 1982–83), and most notably two UEFA Cup titles (1981–82 and 1986–87). He was also a part of the IFK Göteborg team that reached the semi-finals in the 1985–86 European Cup before being eliminated by FC Barcelona.

After having been the first-choice goalkeeper for IFK Göteborg from 1981 until 1987, he retired from competitive football in 1988. In total Wernerson spent seven seasons as a player with IFK Göteborg, appearing in 370 games including friendly games in which he also scored one goal. He kept a clean sheet in 18 European games for IFK Göteborg, which is a club record.

International career 
Wernerson made his full international debut for Sweden in a Euro 1980 qualifier against Luxembourg on 23 October 1979. He went on to mostly serve as back-up goalkeeper for Thomas Ravelli during his international career. He made his ninth and ultimately last international appearance on 18 November 1985 in a 1986 FIFA World Cup qualifier against Malta.

Career statistics

Club

International

Honours 
IFK Göteborg

 UEFA Cup: 1981–82, 1986–87
 Swedish Champion: 1982, 1983, 1984, 1987
 Svenska Cupen: 1981–82, 1982–83
Individual
 Stor Grabb: 1983
 Årets Ärkeängel: 1985

References 

1955 births
Living people
Swedish footballers
Sweden international footballers
Association football goalkeepers
IFK Göteborg players
People from Nässjö Municipality
Åtvidabergs FF players
UEFA Cup winning players
Allsvenskan players
Division 2 (Swedish football) players
Sportspeople from Jönköping County